The Relative Value of Things is an album by clarinetist Ben Goldberg and drummer Kenny Wollesen which was released on the 33¼ Records label in 1992.

Reception

In his review for Allmusic, Thom Jurek observed "This is a gorgeous little date between two of the downtown scene's most singing and adaptable personages. Here is a program of gently swinging originals and jazz nuggets that offer a startling view of all the tonal possibilities offered by such a stripped down pairing".

Track listing
All compositions by Ben Goldberg except as indicated
 "Introspection" (Thelonious Monk) - 6:27   
 "The Voice" - 7:02   
 "Hangman Roach" - 2:58   
 "Salt Peanuts" (Dizzy Gillespie, Kenny Clarke) - 3:36   
 "Kabenny" - 18:55   
 "Light Blue" (Monk) - 4:40   
 "Folleree Folleroo" - 2:20   
 "Pursuit of Facts" - 7:30   
 "Two Nexters" - 5:05   
 "Spot" - 5:42   
 "Diagonal Man" - 3:37   
 "Children's Song" - 4:01

Personnel
Ben Goldberg - clarinet, bass clarinet
Kenny Wollesen - drums

References 

Ben Goldberg albums
1992 albums